Roboastra rubropapulosa is a species  of sea slug, a polycerid nudibranch, a marine gastropod mollusc in the family Polyceridae.

Distribution
This species was described from Pulu Pasi Tanette, Sulawesi, Indonesia, .

References

Polyceridae
Gastropods described in 1905